Mario Alberto Santana (born 23 December 1981) is an Argentine football coach and former winger. He is currently a technical collaborator for Italian club Palermo.

Club career

Early career
He started his career for Argentinian team San Lorenzo. After his contract with San Lorenzo expired, he decided to try his luck in European football, moving to Italy in January 2002 for Serie A team Venezia, then relegated at the end of the season. He then followed his chairman Maurizio Zamparini to Serie B team Palermo, where he showed high qualities in his role.

In 2003, he was then loaned to Serie A side A.C. ChievoVerona (along with Stefano Morrone with Eugenio Corini moved to opposite direction), becoming one of the most interesting wingers in the Italian top division, and being first capped for the Argentina national football team in a friendly match against Japan on 18 August 2004. He then came back to Palermo, that was just promoted in Serie A at the time, for the following season.

Fiorentina
In May 2006, he was signed by la viola for €6.5 million (€5 million plus 50% of Parravicini) to prepare for 2006–07 UEFA Champions League 3rd qualifying round. But due to 2006 Serie A scandal, Fiorentina finished 9th and did not qualify for any European competitions.

In 2009–10 season, La Viola signed Marco Marchionni, made Santana at first became a backup player, likes the first group stage of 2009–10 UEFA Champions League match against Lyon, substituted Marchionni in the 72 minutes. He started the third group stage match, as Marchionni was rested. In the 4th match he lost his starting place again, to Marchionni. He substituted Juan Vargas in the 77th minutes in that match. In the last 2 match of the group stage, Santana played a new role, as attacking midfielder, as Adrian Mutu was rested.

In the league Santana was moved to left midfield position (rotated with Vargas), attacking midfielder, second striker (when Mutu was unavailable and later the coach preferred Jovetić) or right midfielder when Marchionni was rested.

Santana initially had a better chance to play after Martin Jørgensen left in January 2010.

On 14 February 2010, Santana was injured on the league match against Sampdoria, missed the Champions League match against Bayern Munich.

In April 2010, Santana was injured and expected to be out for 5 months after clash with opponent goalkeeper in a club friendly against San Miniato Basso.

Napoli and loans to Cesena and Torino
On 12 July 2011, Santana finally agreed to sign with Napoli over Cesena, leaving Fiorentina after 5 years. He moved on loan to A.C. Cesena on 31 January 2012.

On 12 July 2012, Santana was loaned out to newly promoted Torino F.C. for the 2012–2013 Serie A campaign.

Genoa, later years and return to Palermo
On 19 July 2013, Santana completed a move from Napoli to Genoa. In the January 2014 transfer window, he left Italy after 12 years competing in Serie A, signing a loan deal with Olhanense in Portugal.

He left Frosinone in January 2016 to sign a permanent deal with Lega Pro club Pro Patria, staying at the club also after the club's relegation to Serie D the following season. On 22 June 2018, after Pro Patria won the Serie D title, he signed a contract extension until 2019. He left Pro Patria by the end of the 2018–19 season.

In August 2019, he became the first signing of the refounded Palermo, who will restart from Serie D, thus marking his personal return with the Rosanero after thirteen years. He was also named team captain for the club's 2019–20 season.

On 27 September 2020, following his appearance in Palermo's first game of the 2020–21 Serie C season against Teramo, Santana became the first player in the club's history to have played in four different leagues (from Serie A to Serie D). A month later, he was sidelined after having contracted COVID-19.

On 3 March 2021, he scored the winning goal in a 1–0 away win at Catania in the Sicilian derby, which also was his first goal of the season; with this goal, he also became the first player to have ever scored at least one goal in the top four Italian divisions for Palermo.

Coaching career
On 18 June 2021, Palermo announced Santana's retirement from active football, and his subsequent appointment as a youth team coach. On 16 January 2022, new Palermo first team head coach Silvio Baldini announced Santana will be part of his coaching staff until the end of the season. Following Baldini's departure and the hiring of Eugenio Corini (a former Palermo captain during Santana's first period with the Rosanero) as new head coach, Santana was confirmed as a first team technical collaborator.

International career
He also played for Argentina at the Confederations Cup 2005 and has been frequently capped for the 2006 World Cup qualification matches.

Personal life
Santana acquired his Italian nationality through marriage to his first wife, Italian-Argentinian volleyball player Antonella Moltrasio. His nationality was granted in February 2008. He had two children from his first marriage. He successively remarried with a woman from Palermo, with whom he had two more children.

Career statistics

Club

International goals

|-
|1||18 August 2004|| Shizuoka Stadium, Fukuroi Japan||||1–2||1–2||Friendly
|}

References

External links
 Profile at ACF Fiorentina official site
Guardian statistics

1981 births
Living people
People from Comodoro Rivadavia
Argentine people of Spanish descent
Argentine footballers
Association football midfielders
San Lorenzo de Almagro footballers
Argentina international footballers
2005 FIFA Confederations Cup players
Venezia F.C. players
Palermo F.C. players
A.C. ChievoVerona players
ACF Fiorentina players
S.S.C. Napoli players
A.C. Cesena players
Torino F.C. players
Genoa C.F.C. players
S.C. Olhanense players
Frosinone Calcio players
Aurora Pro Patria 1919 players
Argentine Primera División players
Serie A players
Serie B players
Serie D players
Primeira Liga players
Argentine expatriate footballers
Expatriate footballers in Italy
Naturalised citizens of Italy
Expatriate footballers in Portugal
Italian people of Argentine descent
Argentine expatriate sportspeople in Italy